Altai State Pedagogical Academy is a federal state budget institution of higher education in Barnaul, Russia.

Barnaul Teachers Institute was established in 1933 and renamed into Barnaul State Pedagogical Institute in 1941. In 1993 this institution of higher education received a university status. In 2009 Barnaul State Pedagogical University was made an academy but regained its university status in 2014.

History 
At the beginning of the 20th century, the Tobolsk Gubernia was among the most intensively developed primary education areas, in which by 1911 there were only 624 primary schools, and the opening of new educational institutions was hampered by a shortage of teaching staff.

On May 20, 1915 the decision to open the teacher's seminary in Barnaul with an elementary school was made based on the approval of the state list of income and expenses for 1915.

In the “Plan for the compilation of the network of teachers' institutes”, Novonikolayevsk and Barnaul of the Tomsk province were also listed, and within the limits of the “extensive” Tobolsk province. The idea to request the government to open the third teacher's institute in Barnaul was put forward by L. I. Lavrentyev, the trustee of the West Siberian school district.

The Barnaul Teaching Institute was established on September 1, 1933; in 1941 it was renamed into the Pedagogical Institute.

In 1935, the first graduates graduated the Barnaul Teaching Institute: 17 historians, 22 philologists, 30 physicists and mathematicians.

Faculties
Linguistic Institute (former Faculty of Foreign Languages)
Institute of Psychology and Pedagogics (former Faculty of Education and Faculty of Elementary Education)
Institute of Physics and Mathematics Education (former Faculty of Mathematics and Informatics and Faculty of Physics)
Institute of Physical Training and Sport (former Faculty of Physical Training)
Faculty of History
Faculty of Philology
Institute of Further Education
Center for Continuing Professional Education (former Faculty of Qualification Level Raising and Professional Retraining of Educational Workers)

References

External links 
 

Universities and institutes established in the Soviet Union
Universities in Altai Krai
Education in Barnaul
Teachers colleges in Russia
1933 establishments in Russia
Educational institutions established in 1933